Jaume Munar was the defending champion but lost in the final to Carlos Taberner 4–6, 1–6.

This was the second edition of the tournament and second of two editions of the tournament to start the 2021 ATP Challenger Tour year.

Seeds

Draw

Finals

Top half

Bottom half

References

External links
Main draw
Qualifying draw

Antalya Challenger II - 1